Robert Nichols Scola Jr. (born October 30, 1955) is a United States district judge of the United States District Court for the Southern District of Florida.

Early life and education 

Scola earned a Bachelor of Arts degree in 1977 from Brown University and a Juris Doctor in 1980 from Boston College School of Law.

Professional career 

From 1980 until 1986, Scola worked in the Miami-Dade Office of the State Attorney. From 1986 until 1995, he worked in private legal practice, both as a sole legal practitioner and also as a criminal defense attorney. In 1995, Scola became a judge on Florida's Eleventh Judicial Circuit presiding over criminal, civil and family law matters.

On April 29, 2019, Scola, a cancer survivor, recused himself from a case against healthcare insurance company United Healthcare, stating, that the company's denial of treatment was "immoral and barbaric" and that his opinions regarding would prevent him from "deciding this case fairly and impartially."

Federal judicial service 

On May 4, 2011, President Obama nominated Scola to serve as a judge on the United States District Court for the Southern District of Florida. Scola would fill the seat vacated by Judge Paul Huck, who took senior status in August 2010. The United States Senate confirmed Scola in a voice vote on October 19, 2011; he received his commission the following day. Scola Jr. announced he will take senior status on October 31, 2023.

Cases

On October 27, 2021, Scola transferred a lawsuit filed by former President Donald Trump against Twitter from his court to the Northern District of California, holding that a forum selection clause required the California court to decide the case.

References

External links

 

1955 births
Living people
Boston College Law School alumni
Brown University alumni
Florida International University faculty
Florida state court judges
Judges of the United States District Court for the Southern District of Florida
United States district court judges appointed by Barack Obama
21st-century American judges
American people of Italian descent
Criminal defense lawyers
American prosecutors
State attorneys
University of Miami faculty